Sweater Girl  is a 1942 American mystery and comedy film written by Robert Blees and Beulah Marie Dix, directed by William Clemens and starring Eddie Bracken, June Preisser, Phillip Terry, and Betty Jane Rhodes. It was released on July 13, 1942.

The film marked the debut of the classic World War II-era wartime song, "I Don't Want To Walk Without You". The song was performed on screen by actress Betty Jane Rhodes.

Plot
While preparing for Midvale College's upcoming revue, which includes a trick shot with a gun, singer Susan Lawrence develops a romantic interest in Jack Mitchell, who also sings, while their friend Louise Menard is seeing Susan's brother, a professor. All are shocked when songwriter Johnny Arnold is strangled and school reporter Miles Tucker poisoned with the glue from an envelope.

A detective named McGill begins an investigation. One night Jack volunteers to look after Louise's mother, a helpless invalid. Susan becomes worried and, when she arrives, Mrs. Menard is trying to help Jack, who has narrowly avoided being killed.

With help from Louise's father, a professor, McGill deduces that Mrs. Menard is holding a grudge from a previous child's death, which she blames on an initiation rite at the school. She has also secretly exchanged Susan's trick gun with a loaded one, which she uses in the show. Everyone arrives too late, but luckily, Susan's aim is bad, Jack survives and all live happily ever after.

Cast
 Eddie Bracken as Jack Mitchell
 Betty Jane Rhodes as Louise Menard
 June Preisser as Susan Lawrence
 Frieda Inescort as Mrs. Menard
 Charles D. Brown as Lt. McGill
 Kenneth Howell as Miles Tucker
 Johnnie Johnston as Johnny Arnold
 Nils Asther as Prof. Menard
 Phillip Terry as Prof. Martin Lawrence

See also
Sweater girl

References

External links

1942 films
American black-and-white films
American mystery comedy-drama films
1940s mystery comedy-drama films
1942 comedy films
1942 drama films
1940s English-language films
1940s American films